

Results
Arsenal's score comes first

https://www.11v11.com/teams/arsenal/tab/matches/season/1944/

Legend

Football League South

Final league table

Football League South Cup

References

External links
 Arsenal season-by-season line-ups

1943-44
English football clubs 1943–44 season